Yevgeni Zaytsev may refer to:

 Yevgeny Zaytsev (boxer) (born 1965), Soviet boxer
 Yevgeni Nikolayevich Zaytsev (born 1971), Russian footballer
 Yevgeni Zaytsev (footballer, born 1968), Russian footballer